Federal elections were held in West Germany on 6 March 1983 to elect the members of the 10th Bundestag. The CDU/CSU alliance led by Helmut Kohl remained the largest faction in parliament, with Kohl remaining Chancellor.

Issues and campaign
The SPD/FDP coalition under Chancellor Helmut Schmidt was returned to power in the 1980 West German federal election. The coalition parties grew more and more apart over economic policies. Schmidt asked for and won a motion of no confidence on 5 February 1982. The FDP cabinet ministers resigned on 17 September 1982 and the SPD formed a minority government. On 1 October, Schmidt and the SPD government were dismissed from office by a constructive vote of no confidence by the votes of the CDU/CSU Union parties and a majority of the FDP deputies in the Bundestag. The Leader of the Christian Democratic Union and Leader of the CDU/CSU Group in the Bundestag Helmut Kohl succeeded Schmidt. The new coalition had a majority in the Bundestag but early elections were arranged to legitimize it. Neither the Bundestag itself nor the Chancellor has a right to dissolve the Bundestag, so Kohl did this by deliberately losing a vote of no confidence on 17 December 1982. Federal President Karl Carstens then dissolved the Bundestag and held new elections. The Federal Constitutional Court upheld the constitutionality of the dissolution.

The FDP was split by its change of coalition partners. The party leadership under Hans-Dietrich Genscher and Otto Graf Lambsdorff drove the new policy, but they were rejected by a minority under Gerhart Baum, Günter Verheugen and Ingrid Matthäus-Maier. The FDP was defeated in the 1982 Hessian state election on 26 September 1982, losing half its voters by gaining only 3.1 percent of the vote and failing to enter the state parliament thanks to an SPD campaign against the FDP's "betrayal in Bonn". The FDP was defeated again and lost all of its seats in the 1982 Bavarian state election on 10 October 1982.

Helmut Schmidt renounced his chancellor candidacy and was replaced by former Federal Minister of Justice Hans-Jochen Vogel. The SPD encountered difficulties because of the emergence of the Greens. A major issue in this election was the armament question after the NATO Double-Track Decision, something the SPD was deeply split on.

Results

Results by state

Constituency seats

List seats

Post-election 
The coalition between the CDU/CSU and the FDP returned to government, gaining 55.7% of the vote and 55.8% of the seats, with Helmut Kohl as Chancellor. This was the first election in which the Greens secured representation in the Bundestag, and the first which saw a fourth (fifth) party in the parliament since 1960.

Notes

References

Sources
 The Federal Returning Officer
 Psephos

Federal elections in Germany
1983 elections in Germany
Helmut Kohl
March 1983 events in Europe
1983 in West Germany